Charles Allie (born August 20, 1947) is an American masters athletics sprinter. He has set numerous masters world records in sprint events from 200 to 400 meters.

Allie won high school city athletics championships in Pittsburgh.

He attended Hampton University on a track scholarship and earned Bachelor of Science in industrial arts in 1971, then obtained Master of vocational education from University of Pittsburgh in 1978.

After retiring as an industrial arts middle school teacher, he coaches the Nadia Track Club in Pittsburgh, where he is called "Coach Buddy"

and for which he was a founding member at age 40.

In November 2021, Allie was diagnosed with prostate cancer, and began receiving radiation therapy.

The cancer was detected early, so he was able to return to competition fairly soon, though not in his usual competitive shape: he finished 4th in the M70 60 Meter Dash at the 2022 USATF Masters Indoor Championships on March 18 in Fort Washington Avenue Armory, New York City.

Honors
 2005 USATF Masters Hall of Fame
 2013 IAAF-WMA Best Master of the Year
 2018 WMA Athlete of the Year (men)
 2018 USATF Masters Overall Athlete of the Year
 2019 WMA Athlete of the Decade (2010–2019) nominee (male)

Masters World records
World Masters Athletics (WMA) keeps the official list of current Masters WRs, both outdoor

and indoor.

Masters WRs set by American athletes are kept at USATF Masters.

Key:

Outdoor

Masters outdoor WRs are documented in list of world records in masters athletics.

Indoor

References

1947 births
American male sprinters
American masters athletes
World record holders in masters athletics
World Masters Athletics Championships
Masters athletics (track and field) records
Living people